The Wildwood Crest School District is a public school district that serves students in pre-kindergarten through eighth grade from Wildwood Crest, in Cape May County, New Jersey, United States.

As of the 2019–20 school year, the district, comprised of one school, had an enrollment of 275 students and 34.4 classroom teachers (on an FTE basis), for a student–teacher ratio of 8.0:1.

The district is classified by the New Jersey Department of Education as being in District Factor Group "B", the second-lowest of eight groupings. District Factor Groups organize districts statewide to allow comparison by common socioeconomic characteristics of the local districts. From lowest socioeconomic status to highest, the categories are A, B, CD, DE, FG, GH, I and J.

For ninth through twelfth grades, public school students from Wildwood Crest attend Wildwood High School in Wildwood as part of a sending/receiving relationship with the Wildwood Public School District, together with students from North Wildwood and Wildwood Crest. As of the 2019–20 school year, the high school had an enrollment of 245 students and 29.9 classroom teachers (on an FTE basis), for a student–teacher ratio of 8.2:1.

School
Crest Memorial School (CMS) serves students in grades PreK-8. The school had an enrollment of 267 students in the 2019–20 school year.
Lawrence Lhulier, Principal

Administration
Core members of the district's administration are:
David J. Del Conte Jr., Superintendent
James Lushok, Business Administrator / Board Secretary

Board of education
The district's board of education, comprised of five members, sets policy and oversees the fiscal and educational operation of the district through its administration. As a Type II school district, the board's trustees are elected directly by voters to serve three-year terms of office on a staggered basis, with either one or two seats up for election each year held (since 2012) as part of the November general election. The board appoints a superintendent to oversee the day-to-day operation of the district.

Previously the district had nine board members, but in 1936 voters changed that number to five.

References

External links

Wildwood Crest Memorial School

 
School Data for the Crest Memorial School, National Center for Education Statistics

Wildwood Crest, New Jersey
New Jersey District Factor Group B
School districts in Cape May County, New Jersey
Public K–8 schools in New Jersey
The Wildwoods, New Jersey
Schools in Cape May County, New Jersey